Sir Frederick Page (1917–2005) was an English aircraft engineer.

Fred Page (1915–1997) was Canadian ice hockey executive.

Frederick Page or Fred Page may also refer to:
Fred Page (politician) (1858–1929), Australian politician
Sir Frederick Handley Page (1885–1962), English aircraft industrialist
Frederick Page (musician) (1905–1983), New Zealand music professor, pianist and critic
Frédéric Page (born 1978), Swiss soccer player

See also
Chase Page (born 1983), American football player